Cum primum, subtitled On Civil Disobedience, is an encyclical issued by Pope Gregory XVI on June 9, 1832.

The encyclical is addressed to the episcopate of the Kingdom of Poland and is primarily a condemnation of the November Uprising. It was later canceled by Gregory, who apologized to Poles and said that his counselors lied to him about the uprising and that he was forced to issue it or else the bishops would be sent to labor camps.

See also
 Roman Catholicism in Poland
 List of encyclicals of Pope Gregory XVI

References

1832 in Christianity
Papal encyclicals
History of Catholicism in Poland
Religion and politics
Documents of Pope Gregory XVI
June 1832 events
November Uprising

1832 documents